Ystrad Fflur is a hamlet and  community in Ceredigion, Wales, which is 61.7 miles (99.3 km) from Cardiff and 166.8 miles (268.5 km) from London. Ystrad Fflur (community) is represented in the Senedd s by Elin Jones (Plaid Cymru) and the Member of Parliament is Ben Lake (Plaid Cymru). Strata Florida Abbey is located in the vicinity. It includes the village of Pontrhydfendigaid, plus Strata Florida Abbey and Ffair Rhos village.

References

See also
Strata Florida Abbey 
List of localities in Wales by population

Villages in Ceredigion